The Wharekawa River is a river of the Coromandel Peninsula, in the Waikato Region of New Zealand's North Island. It flows northeast to reach the Wharekawa Harbour halfway between Pauanui and Whangamatā.

See also
List of rivers of New Zealand

References

Thames-Coromandel District
Rivers of Waikato
Rivers of New Zealand